New Ancient Strings is a studio album by the Malian musicians Toumani Diabaté and Ballaké Sissoko, released on 22 June 1999 by the British label Hannibal Records. The album comprises eight instrumental duets composed by Diabaté for kora, a stringed instrument of West African music. Diabaté and Sissoko are esteemed as the best and the second-best kora players of their generation, respectively. Their duets were recorded in a single live take within a marble hallway of Bamako's conference centre on the night of 22 September 1997, coinciding with Mali's Independence Day.

New Ancient Strings was inspired by the 1970 album Ancient Strings, a landmark kora album featuring the musicians' fathers, Sidiki Diabaté and Djelimadi Sissoko. By the mid-1990s, Toumani Diabaté had accrued a significant international profile after recording several crossover collaborations. Having brought the kora to wider attention with these genre fusion projects, New Ancient Strings represented his return to his roots in acoustic Mande music. The music balances elements of traditional and modern styles. Diabaté and Sissoko intended to honour their fathers' musical legacy while showcasing the significant developments that had occurred in Malian music during the nearly three decades since the recording of Ancient Strings. For example, the duo's kora playing makes use of novel techniques not used by their fathers, and also incorporates stylistic flourishes influenced by non-Malian music, such as flamenco guitar.

Although the album's release was not publicized by its label, it received favourable reviews in the Western music press and became popular on "world music" radio stations across Europe and the United States. Its longterm sales have greatly exceeded industry expectations for its genre, as it reached an audience through word of mouth. Widely cited as an exemplary recording of Malian music, New Ancient Strings has become a symbol of the country's musical heritage and the kora in particular. Several artists have cited the album among their personal favourites, notably the Icelandic pop star Björk, who professed its influence on her own music and later recorded with Diabaté.

Background 

The kora is a 21-string instrument of West African music, similar to the harp or lute, with origins in the 13th-century during the Mali Empire. The kora is traditionally played as musical accompaniment for a singer.

Sidiki's son Toumani Diabaté was born in 1965, while Djelimadi's son Ballaké Sissoko was born in 1967; the two boys, who were also distant cousins, grew up as neighbors. In 1970, the elder Diabaté and Sissoko participated in the recording of Ancient Strings, the first album of instrumental kora music.

In 1987, Toumani Diabaté first collaborated with ethnomusicologist Lucy Durán on the production of his debut album, Kaira, which became the first commercially released recording of instrumental music for solo kora. By the mid-1990s, the trend in kora playing, and Malian music in general, moved toward electrification and amplification. Durán—who at that point had produced several more recordings by Diabaté, typically cross-genre fusion projects in collaboration with various other artists—came up with the idea of the "new ancient strings" project. She proposed a "back-to-basics" acoustic recording of kora that would remain faithful to the premise of "ancient strings", while also showcasing how far kora-playing had progressed since the early 1970s. The original plan for the project was a recording of Toumani playing kora duets with his father. However, Sidiki Diabaté died in 1996 before the planned sessions could be realized.

Recording 

For the recording of New Ancient Strings, Durán flew from the United Kingdom to Mali's capital city of Bamako with audio engineer Nick Parker. After a period of location-scouting, they received permission to conduct a nighttime session inside the city's then recently completed conference centre, the Palais des Congrès.

Recording took place within a marble hallway between two meeting rooms. As Parker explained in the album's liner notes, the hallway's "hermetic" architectural acoustics were crucial to the recording's natural reverberation. Most other potential indoor recording locations in the country at the time, according to Parker, lacked this quality. Buildings in Mali are commonly constructed with porous materials, usually resulting in subpar resonance; while urban buildings were often made with firmer materials, it was still rare to find one adequately soundproofed to block out the surrounding urban noise pollution. By comparison, Parker felt the Palais des Congrès rivaled European recording studios for its remarkable interior silence, and was "all the more extraordinary when you take into account how very quiet these instruments are in reality."

The album was recorded in a single live take on the night of Mali's national independence day, 22 September 1997. Durán and Parker used four omnidirectional microphones and a portable Nagra four-track recorder. The recording team then returned to London, where Parker mixed the album with Tim Handley. The editing process was minimal. No artificial reverb or other effects were applied to the audio.

Music 
Composed by Diabaté, the album's eight duets each reinterpret or adapt a piece from the traditional  repertoire. Two of the eight tracks are new versions of pieces from Ancient Strings under different titles. Critics have compared the sound of the kora duets on New Ancient Strings to Western classical music. Francis Dordor of the French music magazine Les Inrockuptibles likened the album's fusion of traditional and modern elements to a collaboration between the 18th-century French classical composer Marin Marais and the 20th-century American minimalist composer Terry Riley. Mark Jenkins of the Washington Post said the kora duets "suggest Bach more than Robert Johnson"—distinguishing New Ancient Strings from Diabaté's next album, Kulanjan, a collaboration with the American musician Taj Mahal intended to emphasize continuities between West African music and blues in the United States.

In terms of resemblance to classical music, Diabaté and Sissoko's duets are similar to their father's performances on Ancient Strings, which Durán said "had a very classical feel, almost like Bach with an African tinge." However, Sissoko noted that their playing incorporated techniques that their fathers had never used, such as muffling strings and other techniques inspired by flamenco guitar. According to critic Simon Broughton, the playing on New Ancient Strings sounds "much more effortless than Ancient Strings".

Release 

New Ancient Strings was released on compact disc on 22 June 1999 by Hannibal Records, an imprint of Rykodisc. The album arrived without promotion or publicity efforts from the label. According to Durán, "it was a fight to get the record company to support the project; they did not believe that anyone would be interested." Within two weeks, Hannibal released Diabaté's album with Taj Mahal, Kulanjan, which also featured Sissoko and other Malian musicians. Kulanjan was promoted with an international concert tour and a budget-priced compilation of recordings from the two musicians' respective back catalogs.

Despite the lack of promotion, New Ancient Strings sold well, its reputation spreading by word of mouth. Tracks from New Ancient Strings received significant radio airplay on "world music" stations. The album topped the  European Broadcasting Union's monthly  in May 1999, and it spent nine weeks on the American CMJ New Music Reports "New World" chart, peaking at number 12. On 11 July 2006, Rhino Entertainment and Rykodisc made the album available for digital download for the first time. As of 2011, the album had sold more than 60,000 copies—well above expectations for an album of acoustic music in the "world music" category, which more typically would have been expected to sell no more than about 5,000 copies.

Reception 

Early critical response to the album from the European and American press was generally enthusiastic. Writing for The Boston Phoenix, American musicologist Banning Eyre called it the "most definitive statement to date" of the Malian kora tradition, writing that  kora player has ventured so far out of the old tradition, and none has brought more back. The kora's tapestry of rhythms and melodies have never sounded richer." Francis Dordor at Les Inrockuptibles anticipated that the recording would endure as a musicological document of the kora and the music of the Mandinka people. In a review for British magazine The Wire, Julian Cowley predicted the album "will surely prove to be a defining moment in the history of recorded kora music". Cowley praised the musicians for exploring "the technical potential of the instrument and their own innate musicality", creating a fully "contemporary" sound without resorting to stylistic "hybridisation" (in the sense of crossover music).

At JazzTimes, Josef Woodard wrote that "this album, beautifully played and sensitively realized, confirms our suspicions that the kora is not only one of the most fascinating and inspiring instruments in Africa, but in the world at large." Canadian critic Roger Levesque, who gave the album a five-star rating in Edmonton Journal, said it "offers a wonderful, airy, multi-layered sound as a simultaneous source of melody and pulsing rhythms ... but as often as not the two musicians conjure up a dreamlike atmosphere that serves well for ambient aural backdrops.". The American critic Robert Christgau dissented from the otherwise favorable contemporary consensus, rating the album a "dud" in The Village Voice and his Consumer Guide: Albums of the '90s book. Though Christgau enjoyed Diabaté's work with Taj Mahal on Kulanjan, he dismissed Diabaté and Sissoko's record for sounding "as New Agey as its title, which is, oh my, New Ancient Strings".

Legacy 
Since its release, New Ancient Strings has continued to receive acclaim from listeners, critics and musicians. In the long run, its success helped to elevate the prestige of kora music on both an international stage and within Mali. Former Malian president Amadou Toumani Touré (in office from 2002–2012) presented important guests and dignitaries with a miniature kora and a copy of New Ancient Strings as a diplomatic gift. The country's national broadcaster, the Office of Radio and Television of Mali (ORTM), regularly used the song "Cheikhna Demba" as theme music.

The album's success has been credited for launching Sissoko's career on the global stage. While Diabaté had already established a substantial profile outside Mali prior to the album's release, the album brought Sissoko's music to a sizable international audience for the first time. In 2021, British journalist Nigel Williamson said Sissoko was second only to Diabaté in terms of global preeminence among kora players. As of that same year, the two musicians remained neighbors in Bamako.

In 2014, Diabaté and his son, Sidiki Diabaté (named after his grandfather), released Toumani & Sidiki, the third album of kora duets in history after Ancient Strings and New Ancient Strings.

The British magazine Songlines ranked New Ancient Strings at 20th place in its 2003 list of the top 50 "must-have world-music" albums and, in 2021, as the third most-essential recording of kora music. Tom Moon included the album in his 2008 book 1,000 Recordings to Hear Before You Die, writing that Diabaté and Sissoko "engage in fiery jazz-like back-and-forth exchanges" and "sustain an intense conversation throughout, trading solo and accompaniment roles seamlessly, generating spiderwebbed clusters of notes that, despite all the finger wizardry, communicate on a pure spirit level." The Observers Mark Hudson named it among ten recommended records of African music for the unacquainted listener, while Jon Pareles of The New York Times included it among his ten recommended albums of contemporary Malian music.

Björk cited the album's sound as a major influence on her 2001 album Vespertine, noting that it affected her approach to "mess[ing] up the sound of too angelic instruments" such as the harp. Diabaté later recorded with Björk, playing kora on the track "Hope" from her 2007 album Volta; according to Diabaté,  listened to New Ancient Strings and decided to include kora in her music." Other musicians who have named the album a personal favorite include Malian singer-songwriter Fatoumata Diawara and Italian pianist-composer Ludovico Einaudi. In November 2020, American musician Donald Glover tweeted a recommendation to listen to the album outside.

Track listing 

Source material
Diabaté's compositions on New Ancient Strings interpret or adapt aspects of traditional Malian compositions. The following descriptions of the album's source material are adapted from the original CD liner notes.

 "Salaman" is based on "Tita", a love song from western Mali.
 "Kita Kaira" is based on "Kaira", a song popularized in the 1940s by Sidiki Diabaté and previously recorded by Toumani Diabaté on Kaira (1988).
 "Bafoulabe" is based on "Mali Sajio", a song commemorating and mourning the killing of a hippopotamus at Bafoulabé in western Mali, where the rivers Senegal and Bafing meet.
 "Cheikhna Demba" is based on "Bambugu Nce", a traditional composition from central Mali originally dedicated to the 18th-century Bambara king Bambuguchi Diarra in praise of his work to construct an irrigation canal from the Niger River to Ségou.
 "Kora Bali" is based on "Tutu Diarria", a traditional composition originally dedicated to the 18th-century Bambara king Tutu Diarria, specifically drawing on the version recorded by Sidiki Diabaté and Djelimadi Sissoko for Ancient Strings.
 "Kadiatou" is based on "Baninde", a traditional composition originally dedicated to the 19th-century king Sanuge Gimba, who ruled a town called Kaba near the Mali–Guinea border.
 "Yamfa" is based on the traditional composition "Alla l'aa ke" (previously recorded by Diabaté on Kaira) and a melody composed by Nene Koita, Diabaté's mother.

Personnel 
Credits adapted from the original CD packaging and liner notes.
 Toumani Diabaté – kora
 Ballaké Sissoko – kora
 Lucy Durán – production, photography, liner notes
 Nick Parker – recording engineer, editing, mixing, liner notes
 Tim Handley – editing, mixing
 Olivia Design – artwork

Notes

References

Sources

External links 
 
 
 
 Liner notes via the Internet Archive

1999 albums
Folk albums by Malian artists
Hannibal Records albums
Instrumental duet albums
World music albums by Malian artists